Entobius is a genus of crustaceans belonging to the monotypic family Entobiidae.

The species of this genus are found in Western Europe and Northern America.

Species:

Entobius euelpis 
Entobius hamondi 
Entobius loimiae 
Entobius scionides

References

Crustaceans